The 1947 Los Angeles Dons season was their second in the All-America Football Conference. The team failed to improve on their previous output of 7–5–2, losing seven games. They failed to qualify for the playoffs for the second consecutive season.

The team's statistical leaders included Charlie O'Rourke with 1,449 passing yards, John Kimbrough with 562 rushing yards, Dale Gentry with 352 receiving yards, and Ben Agajanian with 84 points scored (39 extra points, 15 field goals).

Season schedule

Division standings

References

Los Angeles Dons seasons
Los Angeles Dons
Los Angeles Dons